The 2012–13 Montenegrin First League was the seventh season of the top-tier football in Montenegro. The season began on 11 August 2012 and ended on 1 June 2013. The mid-season winter break began on 2 December 2012 and ended on 7 March 2013. FK Budućnost Podgorica are the defending champions.

Teams
Last season, Bokelj, Berane, and Dečić were relegated to the Montenegrin Second League. Montenegrin Cup winners FK Čelik Nikšić were promoted along with Mornar and Jedinstvo Bijelo Polje.

Stadiums and locations 

All figures for stadiums include seating capacity only, as many stadiums in Montenegro have stands without chairs which would otherwise be the actual number of people able to attend football matches not regulated by UEFA or FIFA.

League table

Results
The schedule consisted of three rounds. During the first two rounds, each team played each other once home and away for a total of 22 matches. The pairings of the third round were then set according to the standings after the first two rounds, giving every team a third game against each opponent for a total of 33 games per team.

First and second round

Third round
Key numbers for pairing determination (number marks position after 22 games):

Relegation play-offs
The 10th-placed team (against the 3rd-placed team of the Second League) and the 11th-placed team (against the runners-up of the Second League) will both compete in two-legged relegation play-offs after the end of the season.

Summary

Matches

Mogren won 9–2 on aggregate.

Mornar won 2–1 on aggregate.

Top scorers

References

External links
 Season on soccerway.com

Montenegrin First League seasons
Monte
1